Tugiyati Cindy (born 21 July 1985) is an Indonesian football player. She is currently playing for Putri Mataram and is a member of the Indonesia women's national football team.

International goals

References

1985 births
Living people
Indonesian women's footballers
Women's association football midfielders
Indonesian women's futsal players
People from Gunung Kidul Regency
Sportspeople from Special Region of Yogyakarta
Indonesia women's international footballers
Footballers at the 2018 Asian Games
Asian Games competitors for Indonesia